Namisindwa District is a district in the Eastern Region of Uganda. The town of Bupoto is the district headquarters.

Location
Namisindwa District is bordered by Bududa District to the north, Kenya to the east and south, Tororo District to the south-west, and Manafwa District to the west.

Overview
Namisindwa District became operational on 1 July 2017. Prior to that the new district was "East Bubulo County" in Manafwa District. The rationale for creating the new district was (a) to bring services closer to the people and (b) create jobs and reduce youth unemployment.

As of August 2015, the district had 80 schools. The district terrain in described as "hilly", and prone to soil erosion during the rainy season. The gravel roads need frequent maintenance. The Bumbobi–Bubulo–Lwakhakha Road traverses the district in a general northwest to southeast direction.

Population
In 2009, the population of Namisindwa District (Bubulo County East), was estimated at approximately 177,000. In July 2016, the Uganda Bureau of Statistics (UBOS), estimated the district population at approximately 178,746.

See also
Bamasaba
Bugisu sub-region

References

External links
Government Tables Proposal on New Districts Aa of 18 July 2012.

 

 
Districts of Uganda
Eastern Region, Uganda
Bugisu sub-region